This is a list of Malaysian states and federal territories by Human Development Index as of 2021.

See also
List of countries by Human Development Index

References 

Malaysia
Human Development Index
Malaysia